Yang Zhicheng, may refer to:

Yang Zhicheng (Tang dynasty), a Tang dynasty general.

Yang Zhicheng (PLA general), a PLA general.